George Butterworth (1858–1941) was a British tennis player and sportsman active during the late 19th century. He was a semi finalist at the 1880 Wimbledon Championships losing to Herbert Lawford. Between 1880 and 1896 he won 4 career titles.

Tennis career
Butterworth played his first tournamentat the 1880 Wimbledon Championships where he reached the semi finals stage, before losing to Herbert Lawford. In 1881 he played at four tournaments that year including the Cheltenham Covered Court Championships where he exited early in round one. The same year he won his first title at the Gloucestershire tournament held at Montpellier Gardens, Cheltenham, and played on grass and asphalt courts. In 1882 he played only two tournaments that year at Wimbledon Butterworth lost in the second round to Richard Richardson. He then played at the West of England Championships at Bath and won the title against his brother Alexander Kaye Butterworth.

In 1883 he entered for play in four tournaments this year. He successfully defended his Gloucestershire title against George Mitton. He travelled to Ireland to play at the Waterford Annual Lawn Tennis Tournament where he won his fourth and final title against Irishman Frederick William Knox. The same year he failed to defend his West of England title losing in the semi finals to Ernest Browne. In 1884 he played one event in Ireland where he failed to defend his Waterford title losing Frederick Knox in straight sets.

Butterworth did not play another tournament until 1895 when he entered the Clifton LTC tournament, but lost in the first round by conceding a walkover to Herbert Baddeley. In 1896 he played the West of England Championships, but was beaten in the quarter finals stage to George Lawrence Orme.

Rugby
Butterworth was also a fine rugby player.  He played for Clifton Rugby Football Club. He was also goalkeeper for Swindon Town FC.

Work and family
Butterworth was a lawyer. In 1899 Herbert Chapman worked as a solicitor’s clerk under the supervision of Butterworth in Swindon. He later emigrated to Christchurch, New Zealand.  His son Hugh died in World War I. George Montague Butterworth's nephew was the composer George Butterworth.

Butterworth returned from New Zealand and lived near Bournemouth. He died in 1941 in a nursing home in Dorking.

References

1858 births
19th-century male tennis players
1941 deaths
English male tennis players
British male tennis players
Tennis people from Gloucestershire